The 1997 Supercopa de España was a two-leg Spanish football match played on 20 August and 23 August 1997. The contestants were Barcelona, who were Spanish Cup winners in 1996–97, and Real Madrid, who won the 1996–97 Spanish League. Real Madrid won 5–3 on aggregate.

Match details

First leg

Second leg

See also
El Clásico

References
 List of Super Cup Finals 1997  RSSSF.com

Supercopa de Espana Final
Supercopa de España
Supercopa de Espana 1997
Supercopa de Espana 1997
Supercopa de España